is a railway station in the town of Nasu, Tochigi Prefecture, Japan, operated by the East Japan Railway Company (JR East).

Lines
Kurodahara Station is served by the Tōhoku Main Line, and is located 171.5 rail kilometers from the official starting point of the line at Tokyo Station.

Station layout
Kurodahara Station has two opposed side platforms connected to the station building by a footbridge. The station is staffed.

Platforms

History
Kurodahara Station opened on September 1, 1891. The station was absorbed into the JR East network upon the privatization of the Japanese National Railways (JNR) on April 1, 1987.

Passenger statistics
In fiscal 2019, the station was used by an average of 440 passengers daily (boarding passengers only).

Surrounding area
 Nasu Town Hall
Kurodahara Post Office
Kurodahara Jinja

References

External links

 JR East Station information 

Railway stations in Tochigi Prefecture
Tōhoku Main Line
Railway stations in Japan opened in 1891
Nasu, Tochigi
Stations of East Japan Railway Company